This Mess is a Place is the fourth studio album by American band Tacocat. It was released on May 3, 2019 under Sub Pop Records.

Tacocat announced a European tour to promote the album, starting in August 2019.

Critical reception
This Mess is a Place received generally favorable reviews from contemporary music critics. At Metacritic, which assigns a normalized rating out of 100 to reviews from mainstream critics, the album received an average score of 76, based on 8 reviews.

Track listing

Charts

References

2019 albums
Tacocat albums
Sub Pop albums